Patrick Kelly (March 17, 1846 – August 2, 1916) was a merchant, farmer and political figure on Prince Edward Island. He represented 3rd Kings in the Legislative Assembly of Prince Edward Island in 1904 as a Conservative.

The son of John Kelly and Sally Woods, both natives of Ireland, Kelly lived in Montague. He was also a dealer in spirits. In 1876, he married Mary Jane Hynes. Kelly was elected to the provincial assembly in a 1904 by-election held after the death of James E. MacDonald. He was defeated when he ran for reelection later that same year.

References 
 

Progressive Conservative Party of Prince Edward Island MLAs
1846 births
1916 deaths